Munkedal is a locality and the seat of Munkedal Municipality, Västra Götaland County, Sweden with 3,718 inhabitants in 2010. Joakim Andersson, an ice hockey player for the Detroit Red Wings, grew up in Munkedal. Olympian Erland Koch was born here. The Battle of Kvistrum took place near the town.

References 

Populated places in Västra Götaland County
Populated places in Munkedal Municipality
Municipal seats of Västra Götaland County
Swedish municipal seats